Calosoma kuschakewitschi is a species of ground beetle in the family Carabidae. It is found in Kazakhstan, Uzbekistan, and Kyrgyzstan.

Subspecies
These four subspecies belong to the species Calosoma kuschakewitschi:
 Calosoma kuschakewitschi batesoni Semenov & Redikorzev, 1928  (Kazakhstan)
 Calosoma kuschakewitschi glasunowi Semenov, 1900  (Uzbekistan)
 Calosoma kuschakewitschi kuschakewitschi (Ballion, 1871)  (Kazakhstan and Uzbekistan)
 Calosoma kuschakewitschi plasoni (Born, 1917)  (Kazakhstan and Kyrgyzstan)

References

kuschakewitschi
Beetles described in 1870